This is a list of the mammal species recorded in Somalia. There are 192 identified mammal species or subspecies in Somalia, of which two are critically endangered, one is endangered, twelve are vulnerable, and four are near threatened.

The following tags are used to highlight each species' conservation status as assessed by the International Union for Conservation of Nature:

Some species were assessed using an earlier set of criteria. Species assessed using this system have the following instead of near threatened and least concern categories:

Order: Afrosoricida (tenrecs and golden moles) 

The order Afrosoricida contains the golden moles of southern Africa and the tenrecs of Madagascar and Africa, two families of small mammals that were traditionally part of the order Insectivora.

Family: Chrysochloridae
Subfamily: Amblysominae
Genus: Calcochloris
 Somali golden mole, C. tytonis

Order: Macroscelidea (elephant shrews) 

Often called sengis, the elephant shrews or jumping shrews are native to southern Africa. Their common English name derives from their elongated flexible snout and their resemblance to the true shrews.

Family: Macroscelididae (elephant-shrews)
Genus: Galegeeska
 Somali elephant shrew, G. revoili 
Genus: Elephantulus
 Rufous elephant shrew, E. rufescens

Order: Tubulidentata (aardvarks) 

The order Tubulidentata consists of a single species, the aardvark. Tubulidentata are characterised by their teeth which lack a pulp cavity and form thin tubes which are continuously worn down and replaced.

Family: Orycteropodidae
Genus: Orycteropus
 Aardvark, O. afer

Order: Hyracoidea (hyraxes) 

The hyraxes are any of four species of fairly small, thickset, herbivorous mammals in the order Hyracoidea. About the size of a domestic cat they are well-furred, with rounded bodies and a stumpy tail. They are native to Africa and the Middle East.

Family: Procaviidae (hyraxes)
Genus: Heterohyrax
 Yellow-spotted rock hyrax, Heterohyrax brucei LC
Genus: Procavia
 Cape hyrax, Procavia capensis LC

Order: Proboscidea (elephants) 

The elephants comprise three living species and are the largest living land animals.
Family: Elephantidae (elephants)
Genus: Loxodonta
African bush elephant, L. africana

Order: Sirenia (manatees and dugongs) 

Sirenia is an order of fully aquatic, herbivorous mammals that inhabit rivers, estuaries, coastal marine waters, swamps, and marine wetlands. All four species are endangered.

Family: Dugongidae
Genus: Dugong
 Dugong, Dugong dugon VU

Order: Primates 

The order Primates contains humans and their closest relatives: lemurs, lorisoids, tarsiers, monkeys, and apes.

Suborder: Strepsirrhini
Infraorder: Lemuriformes
Superfamily: Lorisoidea
Family: Galagidae
Genus: Galago
 Somali bushbaby, Galago gallarum LR/nt
Genus: Galagoides
 Zanzibar bushbaby, Galagoides zanzibaricus LR/nt
Genus: Otolemur
 Northern greater galago, Otolemur garnettii LR/lc
Suborder: Haplorhini
Infraorder: Simiiformes
Parvorder: Catarrhini
Superfamily: Cercopithecoidea
Family: Cercopithecidae (Old World monkeys)
Genus: Erythrocebus
 Patas monkey, Erythrocebus patas LR/lc
Genus: Chlorocebus
 Vervet monkey, Chlorocebus pygerythrus LR/lc
Genus: Cercopithecus
 Blue monkey, Cercopithecus mitis LR/lc
Genus: Papio
 Olive baboon, Papio anubis LR/lc
 Yellow baboon, Papio cynocephalus LR/lc
 Hamadryas baboon, Papio hamadryas LR/nt

Order: Rodentia (rodents) 

Rodents make up the largest order of mammals, with over 40% of mammalian species. They have two incisors in the upper and lower jaw which grow continually and must be kept short by gnawing.

Suborder: Hystricognathi
Family: Bathyergidae
Genus: Heterocephalus
 Naked mole-rat, Heterocephalus glaber LC
Family: Hystricidae (Old World porcupines)
Genus: Hystrix
 Crested porcupine, Hystrix cristata LC
Suborder: Sciurognathi
Family: Sciuridae (squirrels)
Subfamily: Xerinae
Tribe: Xerini
Genus: Xerus
 Unstriped ground squirrel, Xerus rutilus LC
Tribe: Protoxerini
Genus: Paraxerus
 Ochre bush squirrel, Paraxerus ochraceus LC
 Red bush squirrel, Paraxerus palliatus LC
Family: Dipodidae (jerboas)
Subfamily: Dipodinae
Genus: Jaculus
 Lesser Egyptian jerboa, Jaculus jaculus LC
Family: Spalacidae
Subfamily: Tachyoryctinae
Genus: Tachyoryctes
 Northeast African mole-rat, Tachyoryctes splendens LC
Family: Nesomyidae
Subfamily: Cricetomyinae
Genus: Saccostomus
 Mearns's pouched mouse, Saccostomus mearnsi LC
Family: Cricetidae
Subfamily: Lophiomyinae
Genus: Lophiomys
 Maned rat, Lophiomys imhausi LC
Family: Muridae (mice, rats, voles, gerbils, hamsters, etc.)
Subfamily: Deomyinae
Genus: Acomys
 Fiery spiny mouse, Acomys ignitus LC
 Kemp's spiny mouse, Acomys kempi LC
 Louise's spiny mouse, Acomys louisae LC
 Mullah spiny mouse, Acomys mullah LC
 Percival's spiny mouse, Acomys percivali LC
 Wilson's spiny mouse, Acomys wilsoni LC
Subfamily: Gerbillinae
Genus: Ammodillus
 Ammodile, Ammodillus imbellis DD
Genus: Gerbillus
 Berbera gerbil, Gerbillus acticola DD
 Brockman's gerbil, Gerbillus brockmani DD
 Somalia gerbil, Gerbillus dunni DD
 Waters's gerbil, Gerbillus juliani LC
 Rosalinda gerbil, Gerbillus rosalinda DD
 Least gerbil, Gerbillus ruberrimus LC
 Somalian gerbil, Gerbillus somalicus DD
Genus: Microdillus
 Somali pygmy gerbil, Microdillus peeli LC
Genus: Tatera
 Black-tailed gerbil, Tatera nigricauda LC
 Phillips's gerbil, Tatera phillipsi LC
 Fringe-tailed gerbil, Tatera robusta LC
Genus: Taterillus
 Harrington's gerbil, Taterillus harringtoni LC
Subfamily: Murinae
Genus: Arvicanthis
 Neumann's grass rat, Arvicanthis neumanni DD
Genus: Grammomys
 Gray-headed thicket rat, Grammomys caniceps DD
Genus: Mastomys
 Natal multimammate mouse, Mastomys natalensis LC
Genus: Mus
 Delicate mouse, Mus tenellus LC
Genus: Myomyscus
 Brockman's Myomyscus, Myomyscus brockmani LC
Genus: Thallomys
 Acacia rat, Thallomys paedulcus LC
Family: Ctenodactylidae
Genus: Pectinator
 Speke's pectinator, Pectinator spekei DD

Order: Lagomorpha (lagomorphs) 

The lagomorphs comprise two families, Leporidae (hares and rabbits), and Ochotonidae (pikas). Though they can resemble rodents, and were classified as a superfamily in that order until the early 20th century, they have since been considered a separate order. They differ from rodents in a number of physical characteristics, such as having four incisors in the upper jaw rather than two.

Family: Leporidae (rabbits, hares)
Genus: Lepus
 Cape hare, Lepus capensis LR/lc
 Abyssinian hare, Lepus habessinicus LR/lc

Order: Erinaceomorpha (hedgehogs and gymnures) 

The order Erinaceomorpha contains a single family, Erinaceidae, which comprise the hedgehogs and gymnures. The hedgehogs are easily recognised by their spines while gymnures look more like large rats.

Family: Erinaceidae (hedgehogs)
Subfamily: Erinaceinae
Genus: Atelerix
 Four-toed hedgehog, Atelerix albiventris LR/lc
 Somali hedgehog, Atelerix sclateri LR/lc
Genus: Hemiechinus
 Desert hedgehog, Hemiechinus aethiopicus LR/lc

Order: Soricomorpha (shrews, moles, and solenodons) 

The "shrew-forms" are insectivorous mammals. The shrews and solenodons closely resemble mice while the moles are stout-bodied burrowers.

Family: Soricidae (shrews)
Subfamily: Crocidurinae
Genus: Crocidura
 Greenwood's shrew, Crocidura greenwoodi LC
 MacArthur's shrew, Crocidura macarthuri LC
 Somali dwarf shrew, Crocidura nana DD
 Desert musk shrew, Crocidura smithii LC
 Somali shrew, Crocidura somalica LC
 Savanna path shrew, Crocidura viaria LC
 Voi shrew, Crocidura voi LC
 Yankari shrew, Crocidura yankariensis LC

Order: Chiroptera (bats) 

The bats' most distinguishing feature is that their forelimbs are developed as wings, making them the only mammals capable of flight. Bat species account for about 20% of all mammals.
Family: Pteropodidae (flying foxes, Old World fruit bats)
Subfamily: Pteropodinae
Genus: Eidolon
 Straw-coloured fruit bat, Eidolon helvum LC
Genus: Epomophorus
 East African epauletted fruit bat, Epomophorus minimus LC
 Wahlberg's epauletted fruit bat, Epomophorus wahlbergi LC
Family: Vespertilionidae
Subfamily: Vespertilioninae
Genus: Eptesicus
 Botta's serotine, Eptesicus bottae LC
Genus: Glauconycteris
 Butterfly bat, Glauconycteris variegata LC
Genus: Hypsugo
 Eisentraut's pipistrelle, Hypsugo eisentrauti DD
Genus: Neoromicia
 Cape serotine, Neoromicia capensis LC
 Heller's pipistrelle, Neoromicia helios DD
 Banana pipistrelle, Neoromicia nanus LC
 Rendall's serotine, Neoromicia rendalli LC
 Somali serotine, Neoromicia somalicus LC
Genus: Nycticeinops
 Schlieffen's bat, Nycticeinops schlieffeni LC
Genus: Pipistrellus
 Egyptian pipistrelle, Pipistrellus deserti LC
 Kuhl's pipistrelle, Pipistrellus kuhlii LC
Genus: Scotoecus
 White-bellied lesser house bat, Scotoecus albigula DD
 Hinde's lesser house bat, Scotoecus hindei DD
 Dark-winged lesser house bat, Scotoecus hirundo DD
Genus: Scotophilus
 African yellow bat, Scotophilus dinganii LC
Family: Rhinopomatidae
Genus: Rhinopoma
 Egyptian mouse-tailed bat, R. cystops 
 Lesser mouse-tailed bat, Rhinopoma hardwickei LC
 Macinnes's mouse-tailed bat, Rhinopoma macinnesi VU
Family: Molossidae
Genus: Chaerephon
 Little free-tailed bat, Chaerephon pumila LC
Genus: Mops
 Angolan free-tailed bat, Mops condylurus LC
Family: Emballonuridae
Genus: Coleura
 African sheath-tailed bat, Coleura afra LC
Genus: Taphozous
 Hamilton's tomb bat, Taphozous hamiltoni NT
 Mauritian tomb bat, Taphozous mauritianus LC
 Naked-rumped tomb bat, Taphozous nudiventris LC
 Egyptian tomb bat, Taphozous perforatus LC
Family: Nycteridae
Genus: Nycteris
 Andersen's slit-faced bat, Nycteris aurita DD
 Hairy slit-faced bat, Nycteris hispida LC
 Parissi's slit-faced bat, Nycteris parisii DD
 Egyptian slit-faced bat, Nycteris thebaica LC
Family: Megadermatidae
Genus: Cardioderma
 Heart-nosed bat, Cardioderma cor LC
Genus: Lavia
 Yellow-winged bat, Lavia frons LC
Family: Rhinolophidae
Subfamily: Rhinolophinae
Genus: Rhinolophus
Blasius's horseshoe bat, R. blasii 
 Geoffroy's horseshoe bat, Rhinolophus clivosus LC
 Eloquent horseshoe bat, Rhinolophus eloquens DD
 Rüppell's horseshoe bat, Rhinolophus fumigatus LC
 Hildebrandt's horseshoe bat, Rhinolophus hildebrandti LC
 Lander's horseshoe bat, Rhinolophus landeri LC
Subfamily: Hipposiderinae
Genus: Asellia
 Trident leaf-nosed bat, Asellia tridens LC
Genus: Hipposideros
 Sundevall's roundleaf bat, Hipposideros caffer LC
 Commerson's roundleaf bat, Hipposideros marungensis NT
 Ethiopian large-eared roundleaf bat, Hipposideros megalotis NT
Genus: Triaenops
 Persian trident bat, Triaenops persicus LC

Order: Pholidota (pangolins) 

The order Pholidota comprises the eight species of pangolin. Pangolins are anteaters and have the powerful claws, elongated snout and long tongue seen in the other unrelated anteater species.

Family: Manidae
Genus: Manis
 Ground pangolin, Manis temminckii LR/nt

Order: Cetacea (whales) 

The order Cetacea includes whales, dolphins and porpoises. They are the mammals most fully adapted to aquatic life with a spindle-shaped nearly hairless body, protected by a thick layer of blubber, and forelimbs and tail modified to provide propulsion underwater.

Suborder: Mysticeti (baleen whales)
Family: Balaenopteridae (rorquals)
Subfamily: Balaenopterinae
Genus: Balaenoptera
 Common minke whale, Balaenoptera acutorostrata LC
 Sei whale, Balaenoptera borealis EN
 Bryde's whale, Balaenoptera edeni DD
 Blue whale, Balaenoptera musculus EN
 Fin whale, Balaenoptera physalus EN
Subfamily: Megapterinae
Genus: Megaptera
 Humpback whale, Megaptera novaeangliae CR (Arabian Sea population)
Suborder: Odontoceti (toothed whales)
Superfamily: Platanistoidea
Family: Physeteridae (sperm whales)
Genus: Physeter
 Sperm whale, Physeter macrocephalus VU
Family: Kogiidae
Genus: Kogia
 Pygmy sperm whale, Kogia breviceps LR/lc
 Dwarf sperm whale, Kogia sima LR/lc
Family: Ziphidae (beaked whales)
Subfamily: Hyperoodontinae
Genus: Indopacetus
 Longman's beaked whale, Indopacetus pacificus DD
Genus: Ziphius
 Cuvier's beaked whale, Ziphius cavirostris DD
Genus: Mesoplodon
 Blainville's beaked whale, Mesoplodon densirostris DD
 Ginkgo-toothed beaked whale, Mesoplodon ginkgodens DD
Family: Delphinidae (marine dolphins)
Genus: Steno
 Rough-toothed dolphin, Steno bredanensis DD
Genus: Sousa
 Indian humpback dolphin, Sousa plumbea DD
Genus: Tursiops
 Indo-Pacific bottlenose dolphin, Tursiops aduncus DD
 Common bottlenose dolphin, Tursiops truncatus DD
Genus: Stenella
 Pantropical spotted dolphin, Stenella attenuata LR/cd
 Striped dolphin, Stenella coeruleoalba LR/cd
 Spinner dolphin, Stenella longirostris LR/cd
Genus: Lagenodelphis
 Fraser's dolphin, Lagenodelphis hosei DD
Genus: Grampus
 Risso's dolphin, Grampus griseus DD
Genus: Feresa
 Pygmy killer whale, Feresa attenuata DD
Genus: Pseudorca
 False killer whale, Pseudorca crassidens LR/lc
Genus: Orcinus
 Orca, Orcinus orca LR/cd
Genus: Globicephala
 Short-finned pilot whale, Globicephala macrorhynchus LR/cd
Genus: Peponocephala
 Melon-headed whale, Peponocephala electra DD

Order: Carnivora (carnivorans) 

There are over 260 species of carnivorans, the majority of which feed primarily on meat. They have a characteristic skull shape and dentition.
Suborder: Feliformia
Family: Felidae
Subfamily: Felinae
Genus: Acinonyx
Cheetah, A. jubatus 
Genus: Caracal
 Caracal, Caracal caracal LC
Genus: Felis
 African wildcat, F. lybica 
Genus: Leptailurus
 Serval, Leptailurus serval LC
Subfamily: Pantherinae
Genus: Panthera
Lion, Panthera leo VU
Leopard, Panthera pardus VU
Family: Viverridae
Subfamily: Viverrinae
Genus: Civettictis
 African civet, Civettictis civetta LC
Genus: Genetta
 Abyssinian genet, Genetta abyssinica DD
 Common genet, Genetta genetta LC
Family: Herpestidae (mongooses)
Genus: Atilax
 Marsh mongoose, Atilax paludinosus LC
Genus: Helogale
 Ethiopian dwarf mongoose, Helogale hirtula LC
 Common dwarf mongoose, Helogale parvula LC
Genus: Herpestes
 Egyptian mongoose, Herpestes ichneumon LC
Somalian slender mongoose, Herpestes ochraceus LC
Common slender mongoose, Herpestes sanguineus LC
Genus: Ichneumia
 White-tailed mongoose, Ichneumia albicauda LC
Genus: Mungos
 Banded mongoose, Mungos mungo LC
Family: Hyaenidae (hyaenas)
Genus: Crocuta
 Spotted hyena, Crocuta crocuta LC
Genus: Hyaena
 Striped hyena, Hyaena hyaena NT
Genus: Proteles
 Aardwolf, Proteles cristatus LC
Suborder: Caniformia
Family: Canidae (dogs, foxes)
Genus: Vulpes
 Rüppell's fox, Vulpes rueppelli
Genus: Canis
 African golden wolf, Canis lupaster LC
Genus: Lupulella
 Side-striped jackal, L. adusta  
 Black-backed jackal, L. mesomelas  
Genus: Otocyon
 Bat-eared fox, Otocyon megalotis LC
Genus: Lycaon
 African wild dog, Lycaon pictus EN
Family: Mustelidae (mustelids)
Genus: Ictonyx
 Striped polecat, Ictonyx striatus LC
Genus: Mellivora
 Honey badger, Mellivora capensis LC

Order: Perissodactyla (odd-toed ungulates) 

The odd-toed ungulates are browsing and grazing mammals. They are usually large to very large, and have relatively simple stomachs and a large middle toe.

Family: Equidae (horses etc.)
Genus: Equus
African wild ass, E. africanus  presence uncertain
Somali wild ass, E. a. somaliensis presence uncertain
Grevy's zebra, E. grevyi  extirpated
 Plains zebra, Equus quagga  possibly extirpated
Grant's zebra, E. q. boehmi possibly extirpated

Order: Artiodactyla (even-toed ungulates) 

The even-toed ungulates are ungulates whose weight is borne about equally by the third and fourth toes, rather than mostly or entirely by the third as in perissodactyls. There are about 220 artiodactyl species, including many that are of great economic importance to humans.

Family: Suidae (pigs)
Subfamily: Phacochoerinae
Genus: Phacochoerus
 Desert warthog, Phacochoerus aethiopicus LR/lc
 Common warthog, Phacochoerus africanus LR/lc
Subfamily: Suinae
Genus: Potamochoerus
 Bushpig, Potamochoerus larvatus LR/lc
Family: Hippopotamidae (hippopotamuses)
Genus: Hippopotamus
 Hippopotamus, Hippopotamus amphibius VU
Family: Giraffidae (giraffe, okapi)
Genus: Giraffa
 Reticulated giraffe, Giraffa reticulata VU
Family: Bovidae (cattle, antelope, sheep, goats)
Subfamily: Alcelaphinae
Genus: Alcelaphus
Hartebeest, A. busephalus LC extirpated
Genus: Beatragus
 Hirola, Beatragus hunteri CR
Genus: Damaliscus
 Topi, Damaliscus lunatus LR/cd
Subfamily: Antilopinae
Genus: Ammodorcas
 Dibatag, Ammodorcas clarkei VU
Genus: Dorcatragus
 Beira, Dorcatragus megalotis VU
Genus: Gazella
 Dorcas gazelle, Gazella dorcas VU
 Grant's gazelle, Gazella granti LR/cd
 Soemmerring's gazelle, Gazella soemmerringii VU
 Speke's gazelle, Gazella spekei VU
Genus: Litocranius
 Gerenuk, Litocranius walleri LR/cd
Genus: Madoqua
 Kirk's dik-dik, Madoqua kirkii LR/lc
 Silver dik-dik, Madoqua piacentinii VU
 Salt's dik-dik, Madoqua saltiana LR/lc
Genus: Oreotragus
 Klipspringer, Oreotragus oreotragus LR/cd
Genus: Ourebia
 Oribi, Ourebia ourebi LR/cd
Subfamily: Bovinae
Genus: Syncerus
 African buffalo, Syncerus caffer LR/cd
Genus: Tragelaphus
 Lesser kudu, Tragelaphus imberbis LR/cd
 Bushbuck, Tragelaphus scriptus LR/lc
 Greater kudu, Tragelaphus strepsiceros LR/cd
Subfamily: Cephalophinae
Genus: Cephalophus
 Harvey's duiker, Cephalophus harveyi LR/cd
Genus: Sylvicapra
 Common duiker, Sylvicapra grimmia LR/lc
Subfamily: Hippotraginae
Genus: Oryx
 East African oryx, Oryx beisa EN possibly extirpated
Subfamily: Reduncinae
Genus: Kobus
 Waterbuck, Kobus ellipsiprymnus LR/cd
Family: Camelidae
Genus: Camelus
 Dromedary, Camelus dromedarius LC

See also
Wildlife of Somalia
List of chordate orders
Lists of mammals by region
List of prehistoric mammals
Mammal classification
List of mammals described in the 2000s

Notes

References
 

Somalia
Somalia
Mammals